Lou Shaw (c. 1925 – February 11, 2015) was an American producer and screenwriter. He was known for co-creating the medical drama Quincy, M.E. with Glen A. Larson.

Biography
Shaw worked as a writer and producer on multiple television programs from the late 1950s into the mid-1980s. He won an Edgar Award, shared with Tony Lawrence, for the Quincy, M.E. episode "The Thighbone Is Connected To The Knee Bone". Shaw wrote the play Worse Than Murder about the trial of Julius and Ethel Rosenberg. He had a daughter affected with Down syndrome, wrote a novel featuring a man with Down syndrome titled Honor Thy Son in 1994, and often included people with disabilities in storylines and casting. Shaw was married for a time to Peggy O'Shea, a screenwriter for soap operas, with whom he had a son, Chris, born circa 1953.

Television credits 

12 O'Clock High
Barnaby Jones
Beyond Westworld
Columbo
The Donna Reed Show
The Fall Guy
Half Nelson
Love, American Style
Maude
McCloud
The Misadventures of Sheriff Lobo
Mission: Impossible
Naked City
Quincy, M.E.
The Virginian

References

External links 

2015 deaths
1920s births
Year of birth missing
American screenwriters
American male screenwriters
American television writers
American male television writers
American television producers
Showrunners
20th-century American screenwriters